Thomas Baillie (1796–1863) was a lieutenant in the Royal Welsh Fusiliers.

Thomas Baillie  may also refer to:

Thomas Baillie (cricketer) (1868–1934), South African cricketer
Thomas Baillie (Royal Navy officer) (died 1802)

See also
Thomas Bailey (disambiguation)
Thomas Bayly (disambiguation)
Thomas Bayley (disambiguation)